William J. Manson (August 19, 1872 – January 19, 1948) was a Canadian politician. He served in the Legislative Assembly of British Columbia from 1907 to 1912 from the electoral district of Dewdney, a member of the Conservative party.

References

1872 births
1948 deaths
British Columbia Conservative Party MLAs
People from Shetland